SD Northern River is a large multi-purpose auxiliary ship operated by Serco Marine Services in support of the United Kingdom's Naval Service and is currently the largest ship operated by Serco Marine Services, both in terms of dimensions and gross tonnage.

Her duties involve target towing during naval training exercises, noise ranging and data gathering, as well as serving as a submarine escort. SD Northern River can embark the NATO Submarine Rescue System.

See also
Naval Service (United Kingdom)
List of ships of Serco Marine Services

References

External links

Northern River
1997 ships